
Piaseczno County is a unit of territorial administration and local government (powiat) in Masovian Voivodeship, east-central Poland. It came into being on January 1, 1999, as a result of the Polish local government reforms passed in 1998.

As of 2019 its total population is 186,460, out of which the population of Piaseczno is 48,286, that of Konstancin-Jeziorna is 17,023, that of Góra Kalwaria is 12,040, that of Tarczyn is 4,116, and the rural population is 81,465.

Neighbouring counties 
Piaseczno County is bordered by the city of Warsaw to the north, Otwock County to the east, Grójec County to the south, Grodzisk Mazowiecki County to the west and Pruszków County to the north-west.

Administrative division 
The county is subdivided into six gminas (four urban-rural and two rural). These are listed in the following table, in descending order of population.

References 

 
Piaseczno